Southern Birifor is a Gur language of the Niger–Congo family. It is spoken by about 200,000 people, mainly in Ghana, particularly in Upper West and Northern regions, with perhaps ten thousand in Zanzan district of Ivory Coast.

Phonology

Vowels

Consonants

Orthography
It is written in this alphabet:

Long vowels are written double.

References

Oti–Volta languages
Gur languages
Languages of Ghana
Languages of Ivory Coast